The 1979 African Youth Championship was the first edition of the Championship. Algeria were crowned champions after beating Guinea in the final on the away goals rule, with both teams tied 4-4 after two legs. Both teams also qualified to the 1979 FIFA World Youth Championship in Japan.

Teams
The following teams entered the tournament (and played at least one match):

Preliminary round

As Malawi, Madagascar and Senegal all withdrew, the preliminary round was scratched and Kenya, Mauritius and Gambia advanced to the first round.

First round

Uganda, Mali, Togo, Ivory Coast and Gambia withdrew: Mauritius, Morocco, Guinea, Cameroon and Nigeria all advanced to the second round.

|}

Second round

|}

Semi-finals

|}

Final

|}

 Algeria won on away goals.

Winners

Qualification to World Youth Championship
The two best performing teams qualified for the 1979 FIFA World Youth Championship.

External links
African Youth Championship 1979 (rsssf.com)

Africa U-20 Cup of Nations
 Youth Championship
1979 in youth association football